Macaranga beillei is a large shrub or small tree in the family Euphorbiaceae. It is endemic to Côte d'Ivoire.

References

beillei
Endemic flora of Ivory Coast
Trees of Africa
Vulnerable flora of Africa
Taxonomy articles created by Polbot